Christopher Paul Arnold (born November 6, 1947) is a former infielder in Major League Baseball.

Arnold was a versatile utility man. When in the field, he played the majority of the time at second base and third base, with a few games at catcher, shortstop, outfield, and first base. He was most often, however, used as a pinch hitter during his major league career. His personal high for playing time was during the  season, when he was in 78 games and made 192 plate appearances.

Two of Arnold's four career home runs came against Hall of Famers. One came in his third major league at bat, against Phil Niekro on September 10, 1971. The other came against Steve Carlton on May 1, 1974. One of the other two was a pinch-hit grand slam with two out in the bottom of the 9th inning during a comeback victory against the Pittsburgh Pirates on May 1, 1973.

Arnold finished his MLB career with a lifetime batting average of .237, 4 home runs, 51 RBI, and 47 runs scored in 273 ballgames. He later played three seasons with the Kintetsu Buffaloes in Japan, batting .274 with 43 home runs and 174 RBI.

Today, Arnold runs his own very successful sports agency, Professional Sports International, out of his home in Denver, Colorado and has a wife and two daughters.

External links

Retrosheet

Baseball players from Long Beach, California
Major League Baseball infielders
San Francisco Giants players
Lexington Giants players
Fresno Giants players
Amarillo Giants players
Magic Valley Cowboys players
Phoenix Giants players
American expatriate baseball players in Japan
Kintetsu Buffaloes players
1947 births
Living people